The subessive case (abbreviated ) is a grammatical case indicating location under or below something. It occurs in Northeast Caucasian languages like Tsez and Bezhta as well as in Old Nubian.

Grammatical cases